The James River spinymussel (Pleurobema collina) is a species of freshwater mussel in the family Unionidae, the river mussels. This species is native to North Carolina, Virginia, and West Virginia in the United States. It is a federally listed endangered species of the United States.

References

External links
 Hove, M. C. and R. J. Neves. (1994). Life history of the endangered James spinymussel Pleurobema collina (Conrad, 1837) (Mollusca: Unionidae). American Malacological Bulletin

Pleurobema
Bivalves described in 1837
ESA endangered species
Taxonomy articles created by Polbot
Taxobox binomials not recognized by IUCN